The Adonis tetra (Lepidarchus adonis) also known as the jellybean tetra, is a very small African fish of the family Alestidae. It is the only member of its genus.

Range 
Lepidarchus adonis is native to freshwater habitats near the Atlantic coast in Ghana, Sierra Leone, and Côte d'Ivoire.

Size 
The Adonis tetra can reach  2.1 cm long, smaller than the neon tetra, and is one of the smallest fish normally kept in aquaria.

Conservation status 
The IUCN red list lists the Adonis tetra as being vulnerable (2010).  
There is considerable cause for concern because of the increasing levels of pollution in the waterways it inhabits.

References

External links 
 http://aquavisie.retry.org/Database/Aquariumfish/Lepidarchus_adonis.html
  Adonis Tetra Fact Sheet

Alestidae
Tetras
Freshwater fish of West Africa
Fish described in 1966